Pen-y-groes is a village in Carmarthenshire, South Wales which developed as a settlement as a result of the anthracite coal trade. The main colliery was the Emlyn colliery, which opened in 1893 and closed in 1939.

The village has a primary school. It also has a Rugby Union club, affiliated to the Welsh Rugby Union, and a cricket team which plays in the Carmarthenshire League.

It is named after Paenygroes Independent Chapel, a large building at the centre of the village. There is also a Baptist chapel, Calfaria, founded in 1896.

The village was well known as the headquarters of the Apostolic Church. The denomination hosted their International Convention in the village every year from 1916 to 2002. The church moved its main office to Swansea in 2002 but they still have their Bible college and substantial land in the locality.

Notable people 
 David Eirwyn Morgan (1918–1982), a minister, journalist, Welsh nationalist politician and pacifist.

References

Villages in Carmarthenshire